The Bravery Council of Australia Meeting 79 Honours List was announced by the Governor General of Australia, the then Quentin Bryce, AC, CVO, on 1 September 2013.

Awards were announced for 
the Bravery Medal,
Commendation for Brave Conduct and
Group Bravery Citation.

† indicates an award made posthumously.

Bravery Medal (BM)

Sergeant Dean Francis BRIESE, Northern Territory Police
Sergeant Daniel John BURGESS, Victoria Police
Scott Nicholas BUTLER, New South Wales
Lance Corporal Andrew Joseph FENECH, Australian Army
Jamie Scott FERGUSON, Queensland
Brooke Ann FOGARTY, New South Wales
Daniel GRULKE, New South Wales
Michael Kenneth HALL, Western Australia
Constable Sean Malcolm HANLON, Queensland Police
Katherine HILDER, Western Australia
Matthew William HOWARD, Victoria
Heather Louise KING, Western Australia
Simon Joshua LEWIS, New South Wales
Sally Lu McALPINE, Western Australia
Warren William McERLEAN, Queensland
Senior Constable Joshua Dylan PEACH, Tasmania Police
Sean Gary ROBERTS, Western Australia
James Marlon RUSSELL, New South Wales
Antonino SCIDONE, Western Australia
Jason Bryce STONE, Victoria
Jo-Anne URQUHART, Western Australia

Commendation for Brave Conduct

Christopher John ANGWIN, Victoria
Robert Vincent BARRON, Queensland
Darren George BATES, Norfolk Island
Senior Firefighter Corrie James BENSON, Queensland Fire and Rescue Service
Rosalie Michelle BRADES, Western Australia
Dean Laurent BURRELL, Norfolk Island
Timothy John BUSHELL-HAZELL, South Australia
Gregory James DARLINGTON, Queensland
Joan Marion DARLINGTON, Queensland
Ryan Donald HOUSTON, Western Australia
Coel Kenneth IBBERTSON, Queensland
Scott JAMES, New South Wales
Michael Thomas KENNEDY, New South Wales
Peter John LUCAS, New South Wales
Senior Constable Brigitte Ann MANNING-JONES, Queensland Police
Graham William PAGDEN, New South Wales
Steven Samual PRICE, Queensland
Senior Constable Daven Bruce RICHARDS, Queensland Police
Senior Constable Bill Leslie RICHARDSON, Victoria Police
William Bruce RILEY, Queensland
Detective Sergeant Peter John ROBSON-PETCH, Queensland Police
Jason Dale ROFF, Australian Capital Territory
Jodie Marie ROFF, Australian Capital Territory
Ronald Lloyd SCHEUERLE, Queensland
Station Officer Bernard William TRACEY, Queensland
Sam Ash-Lee TWEEDALE, Queensland
Danica Lea Van den BOGERT, Western Australia
Harley Paul WALLIS, New South Wales
Doctor Joe William WEIR, Queensland
Senior Constable Kristie WILLIAMS, Queensland Police
Brendan William WINTER, Queensland

Group Bravery Citation
Awardees are several members from the Bedfordale Voluntary Bushfire Brigade, involved in fire-fighting operations in the RoleystoneKelmscott area during bushfires in February 2011. 
Michael Kenneth HALL, Western Australia
Alexander Bernard LEACH, Western Australia
Michael Raymond McCAVANAGH, Western Australia
Mark Anthony PUTTICK, Western Australia
Antonino SCIDONE, Western Australia
Stephen Edward SMITH, New South Wales

Awardees are several members of the Marysville SES who assisted with the evacuation of residents during the Victorian Bushfires in February 2009.
David Brandon BARTON, Victoria
Jennifer Anne BARTON, Victoria
Josephine Ann HUNTER, Victoria
Thomas Mark PEART, Victoria
Keith David RAY, Victoria 
Ian Jeffrey WALTERS, Victoria

Awardees are members of the public who rescued a man from a burning vessel in Denham, Western Australia on 29 November 2011.
George Ernest DIX, Western Australia
Justin HEWITT, Western Australia
Ronald David MARQUIS, Western Australia

Awardees are voluntary members of the Kinglake Community Emergency Response Team who responded to emergency incidents during the Victorian bushfires in February 2009.
Ian James DUNELL, Victoria
Victoria Lee DUNELL , Victoria
Bartholomew WUNDERLICH, Victoria

Awardees are members of the Reefton Country Fire Authority involved in fire-fighting operations during the Victorian bushfires in February 2009.
Danny James BENNETT, Victoria
Rachel Lee BENNETT, Victoria
Andrew Jeramie McDONALD, Victoria
Ross Edward MINIFIE, Victoria
Kathleen Marie TILLEY, Victoria

Awardees are crew members of sail boat TryBooking.com, who rescued sailors from a stricken vessel during the Melbourne to Port Fairy ocean race 2012
Grant David DUNOON, Victoria
Klaus-Peter FECHT, Victoria
Gordon Ross FISHER, Victoria 
Kimberley John WALKER, Victoria

Awardees are members of the public who rescued several people caught in a rip at Urquhart Bluff beach on 22 January 2012.
Luke Connell BEAZLEY, Victoria 
Angus Harker JOHNSON, Victoria 
Benjamin James PANNELL, Victoria 
Jason Richard PHIELER, Victoria

Awardees are members of the public who rescued two people from a submerged vehicle at Broadbeach Waters, Queensland on 10 June 2012.
John CHAMBERS, Queensland
Evan Dougald DALTON, Queensland 
Tanya Maree MATHEWS, Queensland 
Steven Samual PRICE, Queensland

Awardees are three young boys who went to the assistance of a girl from an offender at Palm Island, Queensland on 12 May 2011.
Harry Frederick FRIDAY, Palm Island
Ralph Paul HUGHES, Palm Island 
Carey Lenny NUGENT, Palm Island

Awardees are Royal Australian Navy personnel involved in the winch rescue of a man from floodwaters at Laidley Creek during the Queensland floods on 11 January 2011.
Commander Scott Christopher PALMER, 
Lieutenant Simon Paul DRIESSEN, 
Chief Petty Officer Kerwyn Louis BALLICO, 
Petty Officer Nicholas Edward ANDERSON,

Awardee assisted of members of the Queensland Police Public Safety Response Team who conducted rescue operations during the Queensland Floods in the Lockyer Valley in January 2011.
Anthony James ALTHAUS, Queensland

References

Orders, decorations, and medals of Australia
2013 awards